Nova Airlines AB, operating as Novair, was a Swedish airline headquartered in Stockholm, Sweden that operates on behalf of one of Sweden's largest travel agencies, Apollo. It its owned by Jet Nordic Group and operates charter flights mainly to the Mediterranean and the Canary Islands. Its main base and hub of operations is Stockholm Arlanda Airport, but the airline also operates from Oslo Airport, Copenhagen Airport, Gothenburg Landvetter Airport and Billund Airport. Novair is scheduled to close on 1 October 2023.

History

Foundation and early years 
Novair was established and started operations in November 1997 with services from Stockholm to Phuket, Thailand and the Canary Islands of Spain on behalf of Apollo, a Swedish travel agency. In 1998, the airline began operating three more Lockheed L-1011 TriStar to destinations in the Far East and the Caribbean, and placed an order for three new Boeing 737-800 to operate destinations in the Mediterranean and Canary Islands. The airline replaced the L-1011 TriStar with two Airbus A330-200 and leased one from Swissair. 

After the September 11 Attacks, Novair was forced to ground one of its Airbus A330-200 due to lack of demand, and leased out the aircraft to a Libyan company. In 2003, Novair took over the Cuban airline Cubana's flights from Cuba to destinations such as London, Madrid and Paris. The airline also replaced its Boeing fleet with new Airbus A321-200. After the 2004 Indian Ocean earthquake and tsunami, Novair were the first Swedish airline to arrive with relief supplies and doctors and to evacuate tourists. Novair also briefly leased an aircraft to Air Madrid in 2006, however, due to their bankruptcy, the aircraft was returned and was instead leased to Kuwait Airways in 2007. When the aircraft was returned from Kuwait, it was parked in Zurich to be stored, thus ending all A330 operations.

In 2009, Novair became the first and only Scandinavian airline to undertake EU project SESAR, and also participated in the MINT-Project to fly "green approaches", also known as continuous descent approaches to reduce fuel burn and noise. Novair also leased an Airbus A330-200 from Orbest and from Air Europa, to be operated with a cockpit crew from the respective airline, and a Novair cabin crew.

Development since 2010
Between 2013 and 2014, Novair leased an Airbus A330-200 from Aer Lingus using the same crew composition, to operate their long-haul destinations. The airline also closes down its crew base at Gothenburg Landvetter Airport in March 2016.

The airline took delivery of two brand new Airbus A321neo aircraft in 2017. The airline originally ordered three aircraft, however, due to the closing of one of its hubs, it was reduced to two aircraft. The airline also operated an Airbus A320 aircraft from Titan Airways between 2016 and 2017 due to a delivery delay with their new aircraft. In 2019, the airline closed its crew base at Oslo Airport. All aircraft are placed at Stockholm Arlanda Airport.

As of 2018, The airline was owned by the German corporation DER Touristik which is a part of the REWE Group, and employed approximately 70 pilots and 245 cabin crew to operate their current fleet of Airbus A321neo aircraft. In April 2021, Novair announced that the airline will be sold to Denmark’s Jet Nordic Group. As a result, two airlines’s Airbus A321 aircraft were supposed to join the fleet of Jet Time, a Danish charter airline.

In February 2023, it has been announced that Novair will cease operations on 1 October 2023 due to a negative business perspective after the airline's owners failed to acquire new contracts. The current partnership with tour operator Apollo will end on this date.

Destinations 

Novair operates flights from Stockholm, Gothenburg, Oslo, Copenhagen, Billund and Oulu to charter destinations on behalf of Apollo. The destinations vary depending on season and include locations in the Mediterranean, the Canary Islands and Egypt. In the past it also operated long-haul flights to destinations including Thailand, India, and Indonesia as well as the Caribbean.

Fleet

Current fleet
As of February 2023, the Novair fleet consists of the following aircraft:

Former fleet
Formerly Novair also operated the following types of aircraft:

References

External links

Novair Safety Video Airbus A321
Novair Music Video "Lifting You"

Airlines of Sweden
Airlines established in 1997
Swedish companies established in 1997
Charter airlines